The West Indies cricket team toured Australia in the 1951–52 season and played five Test matches against Australia. The series was billed as the "World Championship of cricket", with both teams having beaten England in the previous 18 months. In the event, the series was a disappointment with Australia winning fairly easily by four matches to one.

After the Australian leg of the tour, the West Indies team moved on to New Zealand where the first Test matches between New Zealand and West Indies were played. See this article for further details.

The West Indies touring team
The West Indies team was captained by John Goddard, who had led the side to series victories over India and England.

The full side was:
 John Goddard, captain
 Jeff Stollmeyer, vice-captain
 Denis Atkinson
 Robert Christiani
 Wilfred Ferguson
 Gerry Gomez
 Sammy Guillen
 Prior Jones
 Roy Marshall
 Allan Rae
 Sonny Ramadhin
 Ken Rickards
 John Trim
 Alf Valentine
 Clyde Walcott
 Everton Weekes
 Frank Worrell

All of the players except Guillen and Marshall had played Test cricket before the tour, and the two exceptions made their debuts during the Australian leg of the tour.

The Test matches

First Test

West Indies batted uneasily against the speed of Ray Lindwall and Keith Miller, with Goddard, coming in at No 9, top-scoring with 45. The Australians were similarly diffident against Ramadhin and Valentine, but Miller and Lindwall, as batsmen, were more aggressive. Valentine took five for 99 and Wisden recorded that five catches were dropped off his bowling in the space of half an hour. Weekes with 70 and Gomez (55) set a target, but Doug Ring's leg-breaks took six for 80. After five overs from the West Indies opening bowlers Gomez and Worrell, Goddard relied entirely on Ramadhin and Valentine, and they bowled more than 80 consecutive overs between them. Innings of more than 40 apiece from Arthur Morris, Neil Harvey and Graeme Hole took Australia to a narrow victory, despite Ramadhin's five for 90.

Second Test

West Indies batted consistently, with 50s for Worrell (64), Walcott (60), Christiani (76) and Gomez (54). But after Australia had been reduced to 27 for two wickets, Lindsay Hassett was dropped behind the wicket and he went on to score 132 and to put on 235 with Keith Miller, who made 129. Lindwall and Ring then led the tail to a total of 517. Short-pitched bowling by Lindwall and Miller accounted for several of the West Indies batsmen in the second innings, and despite 50s for Weekes and Goddard the Australians needed only 136 to win.

Third Test

Rain had seeped under the covers and 22 wickets fell on the first day for 207 runs. Worrell took six for 34 in Australia's first innings, and Bill Johnston took six for 62 when bowling unchanged throughout the West Indies innings. Australia's captain Arthur Morris – Hassett was injured – rejigged the batting order for the second innings. Ian Johnson and Geff Noblet were out before the end of the first day, but in easier conditions Ring made 67 and Morris 45, while Valentine took six for 102. West Indies needed 233 to win and at 141 for four seemed to be wobbling, but dropped catches allowed Christiani and Gomez to see them home.

Fourth Test

An exciting Test began with a century for Worrell, retrieving West Indies from 30 for three with assistance from Gomez and Christiani. Miller took five for 60. Neil Harvey, with 83, and Miller put on 124 for the fourth wicket but the other Australian batsmen failed and Trim took five for 34. West Indies lost wickets regularly, though there were 50s for Stollmeyer and Gomez before a late-order collapse left Australia to get 260. Hassett made 102, but wickets fell to the spin of Ramadhin and Valentine, and at 222 for nine, the match seemed lost. But Ring, with 32, and Johnston made 38 for the last wicket to bring an unlikely victory and win the series.

Fifth Test

First-day humidity helped the swing bowling of Gomez, who took seven for 55, and Worrell (three for 42), but West Indies fared even worse against the bouncers of Lindwall, Johnston and Miller. Australia's dominance was built on painstaking 60s by Colin McDonald, in his first Test match, Hassett, Miller and Graeme Hole, though Gomez completed a 10 wicket haul in the match. Lindwall and Miller kept up a barrage of bouncers against the West Indies and only Stollmeyer, who made 104, lasted long. Lindwall finished with five for 52. Richie Benaud claimed his first Test wicket with the final delivery of the match.

References

External sources
 Tour home at ESPN Cricinfo
 

1951 in Australian cricket
1951 in West Indian cricket
1952 in Australian cricket
1952 in West Indian cricket
1951-52
Australian cricket seasons from 1945–46 to 1969–70
International cricket competitions from 1945–46 to 1960